Brzegi Małe  is a village in the administrative district of Gmina Sobków, within Jędrzejów County, Świętokrzyskie Voivodeship, in south-central Poland

See also 
 Brzegi

Villages in Jędrzejów County